Measure 16 of 1994 established the U.S. state of Oregon's Death with Dignity Act (ORS 127.800–995), which legalizes medical aid in dying (commonly referred to as physician-assisted suicide) with certain restrictions. Passage of this initiative made Oregon the first U.S. state and one of the first jurisdictions in the world to permit some terminally ill patients to determine the time of their own death.

The measure was approved in the November 8, 1994, general election. 627,980 votes (51.3%) were cast in favor, 596,018 votes (48.7%) against. An injunction delayed implementation of the Act until it was lifted on October 27, 1997.  Measure 51, referred in the wake of the US Supreme Court's 1997 ruling in Washington v. Glucksberg by the state legislature in November 1997, sought to repeal the Death with Dignity Act, but was rejected by 60% of voters. The act was challenged by the George W. Bush administration, but was upheld by the Supreme Court of the United States in Gonzales v. Oregon in 2006.

The law 
Under the law, any competent adult who has been diagnosed, by a physician, with a terminal illness that will kill the patient within six months may request in writing, from his or her physician, a prescription for a lethal dose of medication for the purpose of ending the patient's life. Exercise of the option under this law is voluntary and the patient must initiate the request. Any physician, pharmacist, or other healthcare provider who has moral objections has the right to refuse to participate.

The request must be confirmed by two witnesses, at least one of whom is not related to the patient, is not entitled to any portion of the patient's estate, is not the patient's physician, and is not employed by a health care facility caring for the patient. After the request is made, another physician must examine the patient's medical records and confirm the diagnosis. The patient must be determined to be free of a mental condition impairing judgment. If the request is authorized, the patient must wait at least fifteen days and make a second oral request before the prescription may be written. The patient has a right to rescind the request at any time.  Should either physician have concerns about the patient's ability to make an informed decision, or feel the patient's request may be motivated by depression or coercion, the patient must be referred for a psychological evaluation.

The law protects doctors from liability for providing a lethal prescription for a terminally ill, competent adult in compliance with the statute's restrictions. Participation by physicians, pharmacists, and health care providers is voluntary. The law also specifies a patient's decision to end his or her life shall not "have an effect upon a life, health, or accident insurance or annuity policy."

Impact
From the beginning of 1999 through the end of 2015, a total of 1,545 people have had prescriptions written and 991 patients have died from ingesting medications prescribed under the act.

The median age of the 991 patients who died from ingesting medication was 71; 77.1 percent of patients had malignant neoplasms (cancer).  Of the 991, 51.4% were male (48.6% female); 45.5% had a Baccalaureate degree or higher; 45.3% were married; primary end of life concerns were loss of autonomy (91.6%), inability to make life enjoyable (89.7%), and loss of dignity (78.7%).

An independent study published in the October 2007 issue of the Journal of Medical Ethics reports there was "no evidence of heightened risk for the elderly, women, the uninsured, people with low educational status, the poor, the physically disabled or chronically ill, minors, people with psychiatric illnesses including depression, or racial or ethnic minorities, compared with background populations."

The Death with Dignity Act was the basis of the Washington Death with Dignity Act in 2008. In 2011 the documentary film  How to Die in Oregon was released.  It won the Grand Jury prize for documentary film at the 27th Sundance Film Festival.

According to Dignity in Dying, Lord Falconer's Assisted Dying Bill, first tabled in the House of Lords in June 2014, "draws on the experience" of the Death with Dignity Act.

Attempts to repeal
In addition to arguments against physician-assisted dying, opponents feared that terminally ill people throughout the nation would flock to Oregon to take advantage of the law. This fear has not been realized, largely because drafters of the law limited its use to Oregon residents.
Despite the measure's passage, implementation was tied up in the courts for several years.

In 1997, the Oregon Legislative Assembly referred Measure 51, which would have repealed the act, to the ballot.

Proponents of Measure 51 argued that the Death with Dignity Act lacked a mandatory counseling provision, a family notification provision, strong reporting requirements, or a strong residency requirement. Measure 51 opponents argued that sending the measure back to voters was disrespectful considering they had already passed Measure 16 via the initiative process. They also felt that the safeguards in the Death with Dignity Act were adequate.

Measure 51 was defeated in the November 4, 1997, special election with 445,830 votes in favor, and 666,275 votes against.

Some members of the United States Congress, notably Senator Don Nickles of Oklahoma, tried to block implementation of Measure 16, but failed.

In 2002, federal judge Robert E. Jones blocked a move by United States Attorney General John Ashcroft to suspend the license for prescribing drugs covered in the Controlled Substances Act of doctors who prescribed life-ending medications under the Oregon law. The Ninth Circuit Court of Appeals affirmed the block, stating that the "Attorney General lacked Congress' requisite authorization".

In October 2005, the U.S. Supreme Court heard arguments in the case of Gonzales v. Oregon to determine the fate of the Death with Dignity law.  Arguing on behalf of the state was Oregon Senior Assistant Attorney General Robert Atkinson. Oregon's five Democratic members of Congress also filed a brief in support of the State's position. United States Solicitor General Paul Clement argued on behalf of the Bush administration, which challenged Oregon's right to regulate the practice of medicine when that practice entails prescribing federally controlled substances. On January 17, 2006, the court ruled 6–3 in favor of Oregon, upholding the law.

See also
 Act 39 in Vermont, the first state to pass a death with dignity law by legislative action
 Assisted suicide in the United States
 List of Oregon ballot measures
 California End of Life Option Act
 Compassion & Choices of Oregon, providing medical consultation and direct service for persons eligible for the Oregon Death with Dignity law.
 Death with Dignity National Center, an organization founded to pass and support the law.
 Massachusetts Death with Dignity Initiative
 Washington Death with Dignity Act, a similar measure passed in November 2008 in the state of Washington
 Baxter v. Montana, a court decision legalizing aid in dying in Montana
 Gonzales v. Oregon
 Washington v. Glucksberg
 Euthanasia in Australia
 Voluntary Assisted Dying Act 2017 (Victoria)

References

External links
 Official Oregon Health Authority page on the DWDA with Annual Reports
 Web site in favor of law
 Briefs filed by the state of Oregon in the Oregon v. Gonzales case
 Is the Oregon Death with Dignity Act a good law? Website with pros and cons
 Oregon Voter's Pamphlet Special Election November 1997 – Measure 51includes the full text of the measure, and arguments for and against
 The New Atlantis: Ten Years of "Death with Dignity"

1994 Oregon ballot measures
1997 Oregon ballot measures
Death in Oregon
Initiatives in the United States
Assisted suicide in the United States